Trio de Ouro (Gold Trio) was a Brazilian vocal group formed by Herivelto Martins in 1937. They performed regularly at the Cassino da Urca. The trio was composed of two men and one woman, who, through the years, included Dalva de Oliveira, Noemi Cavalcante (briefly), Lourdinha Bittencourt (until her death), and finally, Shirley Dom.

Successes

Filmography

References

Brazilian musical groups
Performing groups established in 1937
Vocal trios